Chang King Hai (1917 – 16 August 1973), also romanizated as Cheong Kam-hoi, was a Chinese professional footballer who played at the 1948 Olympics.

Career
Born and started his career in Shanghai, he moved to Hong Kong, in the British Empire due to the Second Sino-Japanese War. He was a player of Eastern in the 1939–40 season.

Chang represented China at the 1948 Olympics. He also represented Hong Kong in 1949 Hong Kong–Vietnam Interport against Saigon in 1949. Both teams were not a member of FIFA at that time.

Personal life
His sons Cheung Chi Doy and Cheung Chi Wai were born in Hong Kong, but represented Republic of China (Taiwan), instead of Hong Kong or People's Republic of China.

References

External links

 

1917 births
1973 deaths
Chinese footballers
Hong Kong footballers
China international footballers
Hong Kong international footballers
Eastern Sports Club footballers
Hong Kong First Division League players
Footballers at the 1948 Summer Olympics
Olympic footballers of China
Dual internationalists (football)
Footballers from Shanghai
Association football forwards
Sing Tao SC players
Chinese emigrants to British Hong Kong